Paizay-le-Chapt is a small commune in the Deux-Sèvres department of the region Nouvelle-Aquitaine in western France. The town of Paizay-le-Chapt is part of the canton of Mignon-et-Boutonne and the arrondissement of Niort.

Population and housing
The population of Paizay-le-Chapt was 257 in 1999, 262 in 2006 and 261 in 2018. The population density of Paizay-le-Chapt is 13 inhabitants per km². The number of housing of Paizay-le-Chapt was 159 in 2007. These homes of Paizay-le-Chapt consist of 114 main residences, 30 second or occasional homes and 15 vacant homes.

See also
Communes of the Deux-Sèvres department

References

Communes of Deux-Sèvres